The Province of Lecce is a province in the Apulia region of Italy whose capital is the city of Lecce. The province is called the "Heel of Italy". Located on the Salento peninsula, it is the second most-populous province in Apulia and the 21st most-populous province in Italy.

There are 97 comunes (Italian: comuni) in the province. It is surrounded by the provinces Taranto and Brindisi in the northwest, the Ionian Sea in the west, and the Adriatic Sea in the east. This location has established it as a popular tourist destination. It has been ruled by the Romans, Byzantine Greeks, Carolingians, Lombards, and Normans. The important towns are Lecce, Gallipoli, Nardò, Maglie, and Otranto. Its important agricultural products are wheat and corn.

History

The province of Lecce has its origins in the medieval Giustizierato, known then as the Province of Terra d'Otranto. Since the eleventh century the Terra d'Otranto included the territories of the provinces of Lecce, Taranto and Brindisi, with the exception of Fasano and Cisternino. During this time Lecce was severely affected by poverty despite the production of olive oil. People from Lecce migrated to the Province of Bari, where they worked in the wine industry. Up to 1663, the Province of Terra d'Otranto also included the territory of Matera (Basilicata). Its first capital was Otranto but in the Norman period (twelfth century), Lecce city was made the capital. After the unification of Italy, the name Terra d'Otranto was changed to Province of Lecce and its territory was divided into the four districts; Lecce, Gallipoli, Brindisi and Taranto. Its break-up began in 1923 when the district of Taranto was transformed into the new province of the Ionian. 

After the first world war economic conditions worsened and unemployment peaked. These factors, coupled with the negligence of the weak government, prompted farm workers to revolt against their employers. Farm owners were captured and paraded in public places. During the medieval era, Muslim slaves were transported from the province's ports and the practice of keeping slaves was common. Lecce stone extracted from the province has been used to decorate several historical monuments and is widely used for interior decoration.

Tourism
The  is located in the province. It is a  protected area that was set up in 1977 along the Adriatic coast near Leccce. The Reserve is home to a large number of animals such as foxes, hedgehogs, badgers, weasels, reptiles and birds. A variety of Mediterranean plants species is also found here. Lakes Alimini Grande and Alimini Piccolo are also located in the province. Lake Alimini Grande is surrounded by a rocky area covered with pine woods and Mediterranean vegetation; also, its depth does not exceed four meters, and the water is rich with shellfish.  Lake Alimini Piccolo is found further inland and consists of freshwater; this water comes from the groundwater channel of the Rio Grande. Alimini Piccolo's depth does not exceed half a meter. 

Another tourist destination is the Ciolo, which is a canyon and includes also many caves. It is a natural habitat for many species of vagile meiofauna and ferns.

Communes

Lecce has several ethnic and linguistic minority groups. A Griko community of around 40,000 lives in the Grecia Salentina region in the central area of the province, and there is an Arbëreshe community in Soleto.

References

Sources

External links 

 

 
Lecce